Sensation (psychology) refers to the processing of the senses by the sensory system.

Sensation or sensations may also refer to:

In arts and entertainment

In literature 
Sensation (fiction), a fiction writing mode
Sensation novel, a British literary genre
Sensation Comics, a comic book series

In film and television 
Sensation (2021 film), a British mystery thriller film
Sensation (1936 film), a British crime film
Sensations of 1945, a 1944 American musical-comedy film
Sensations (film), a 1975 pornographic film
Sensation, a 1995 film starring Kari Wührer

In music and dance 
Sensations, a sub-group of Hey! Say! JUMP 
"Sensation" (song), by The Who
"Sensations" (Alphaville song), a song by German band Alphaville
Sensation (album), by Anúna, released in 2006
The Sensations, an American musical R&B/pop quartet of the 1950s and early 1960s
Sensation (event), an indoor dance event which originated from the Netherlands
SENSATION (music project), a band and a label formed by the Malaysian-Chinese singer-songwriter Gary Chaw

Other uses in arts and entertainment 
Sensation (art exhibition), a controversial British art exhibition

In science and technology 
Aeroflying Sensation, a French ultralight aircraft
HTC Sensation, a HTC mobile phone
Sensation Science Centre, a science centre in Dundee, Scotland

Businesses 
Sensation Animation, a subsidiary group of the Walt Disney Corporation
Sensation Lawn Mowers, a defunct manufacturer of lawn mowers and lawn equipment

Other uses 
Sensation (mango), a mango cultivar that originated in south Florida
Sensation (ship), Carnival Cruise Line ship
Sensation, Arkansas, a ghost town
Sensation play (BDSM), a term in sexual culture
Walkers Sensations, a type of potato crisp
Vedana, the Buddhist concept of sensation

See also
Sense
Sensationalism
Sensory (disambiguation)